David Randolph Ames (January 16, 1937 in Portsmouth, Virginia – August 4, 2009 in Richmond, Virginia from Lou Gehrig's disease (ALS)) was an American football defensive back and halfback.  He played college football at the University of Richmond, and played professionally in the American Football League (AFL) for the New York Titans and the Denver Broncos in 1961.  He was drafted by the National Football League's Pittsburgh Steelers in the 1960 NFL Draft.

See also

List of American Football League players

External links
NFL.com profile
Obituary

1937 births
2009 deaths
Sportspeople from Portsmouth, Virginia
Players of American football from Virginia
American football defensive backs
American football halfbacks
Richmond Spiders football players
New York Titans (AFL) players
Denver Broncos (AFL) players
Deaths from motor neuron disease
Neurological disease deaths in Virginia